Feinan, Feynan or Faynan may refer to:

Punon, one of the stations of the Exodus mentioned in the Bible
Wadi Feynan, a seasonal river valley in southern Jordan
Khirbat Faynan, the ancient town of Phaino, now an archaeological site in the Wadi Feynan